Irrigation Way is a major rural road that runs approximately  through the Murrumbidgee Irrigation Area in south western New South Wales, Australia.

Route
Irrigation Way commences at the intersection with Newell Highway in Narrandera and heads in a north-westerly direction for  before reaching Leeton, continuing another  before ending at the intersection with Kidman Way in Griffith. The road is an important link between the three towns as it is a very productive farming region. Irrigation Way provides a direct route between the national highway network and Griffith. This complements the two state routes that pass through Griffith. The route is most important in linking Leeton to other regions of the state as its only major road.

History
The passing of the Main Roads Act of 1924 through the Parliament of New South Wales provided for the declaration of Main Roads, roads partially funded by the State government through the Main Roads Board (later the Department of Main Roads, and eventually Transport for NSW). With the subsequent passing of the Main Roads (Amendment) Act of 1929 to provide for additional declarations of State Highways and Trunk Roads, Main Road 254 was declared on 5 December 1929, from Griffith via Leeton, Yanco and Narrandera (continuing south to the intersection with Trunk Road 58, later Sturt Highway, at Gillenbah, and north to Hillston).

The Department of Main Roads, which had succeeded the MRB in 1932, declared Trunk Road 80 on 16 March 1938, from Griffith via Leeton to the intersection with State Highway 17 (later Newell Highway), in Narrendera (and continuing westwards via Hillston to Mossgiel), subsuming the alignment of Main Road 254 between Narrandera and Hillston; Main Road 254 was re-declared from Yenda to the intersection with Trunk Road 80 at Wumbulgal as a result.

The passing of the Roads Act of 1993 updated road classifications and the way they could be declared within New South Wales. Under this act, Irrigation Way today retains its declaration as part of Main Road 80, from Narrandera to Griffith.

The route was allocated State Route 94 in 1974 between Yoogali and Griffith. With the conversion to the newer alphanumeric system in 2013, this was replaced with route B94.

Towns
The Narrandera Airport is also located on the Irrigation Way,  from Narrandera. Irrigation Way reaches the Shire of Leeton shortly after the airport.

Leeton: Irrigation Way begins in the Leeton Shire between Narrandera Airport and the turn off to Rockdale Beef. After travelling approximately  the small village of Yanco is reached. The Yanco CBD is located on Irrigation Way as Main Street. Leeton's CBD is also found on Irrigation Way. On the southern approach to town there are schools, offices and residential properties before the main streets are reached. On the northern side of town large commercial and industrial properties are found before exiting Leeton. The villages of Wamoon and Whitton are bypassed before entering the City of Griffith Local Government Area.

Griffith: Irrigation Way is short in Griffith.

Major intersections

See also

 Highways in Australia
 Highways in New South Wales

References

External links

Highways in New South Wales
Riverina